Spiranthes laciniata, the lacelip ladies' tresses is a terrestrial orchid endemic to the south eastern United States.

Description

Spiranthes laciniata plants are a tall species of Spiranthes reaching a height of 20–95 cm, with up to 5 basal leaves persisting through anthesis. The flowers are white to cream-white and arranged in a spiral around the stem. The lip is usually yellow in the center. Bloom time is from May to (at its northern range) September.

Distribution and habitat

Spiranthes laciniata is native to the southeastern coastal plains, from Texas in the south all the way to New Jersey in the north.

It is a wetland plant and grows in swamps and marshes, sometimes even in standing water.

Taxonomy
The Spiranthes laciniata name was first published by Oakes Ames in 1905, after John Kunkel Small had described the plants in 1903 as Gyrostachys laciniata.

References

laciniata
Orchids of the United States
Plants described in 1905